Salima Ghezali (born 1958) is an Algerian journalist and writer.

A founding member of Women in Europe and the Maghreb, president of the association for the advancement of women, editor of the women's magazine NYSSA, which she founded, and editor of the French-language weekly La Nation, Salima Ghezali is an activist of women's rights and human rights and democracy in Algeria.

In 1997 Ghezali won the Sakharov Prize as well as the Olof Palme Prize.

References

1958 births
Algerian journalists
Algerian women writers
Algerian writers
Berber writers
Kabyle people
Living people
Olof Palme Prize laureates
Algerian women journalists
Sakharov Prize laureates